Season two of El Artista del Año premiered on July 14, 2018, on the América Televisión network.

Cast

Contestants 
On July 11, the first ten participants of the show were presented through a press conference. Although it was predetermined that ten contestants were the same as last season, it was announced that in the second gala would enter two new participants. The first of them was Ebelin Ortiz, while John Kelvin and Mirella Paz met in a duel qualified by the judges to occupy the second pass in the competition, finally the judges decided to give the pass to both, giving a total of thirteen contestants in place of the twelve provided.

During the first five weeks, the married couple Yiddá Eslava and Julián Zucchi participated together, being the first couple participating in the show. From the sixth week they competed individually.

Hosts and judges 
Gisela Valcárcel and Jaime "Choca" Mandros returned as hosts, while Morella Petrozzi, Lucho Cáceres, Fiorella Rodríguez and Cecilia Bracamonte returned as judges. During the second and third week, theater director and presenter Santi Lesmes replaced Cáceres.

Scoring charts 

Red numbers indicate those sentenced for each week
Green numbers indicate the highest score for each week
 the contestant eliminated of the week
 the contestant saved in the duel
 the contestant eliminated and saved with the lifeguard
 the winning contestant
 the runner-up contestant
 the third-place contestant

Average score chart 
This table only counts performances scored on a 40-point scale.

Higher and lower scores 
This table has the highest and lowest scores of each contestants performance according to the 40-point scale.

Notes

References

External links 
 

Peruvian television shows